Mastax fortesculpta is a species of beetle in the family Carabidae with restricted distribution in Zambia.

References

Mastax fortesculpta
Beetles described in 1988
Beetles of Africa